James Henry Jones (18 November 1873 – 27 December 1955) was a British footballer who competed in the 1900 Olympic Games, playing in one match as a goalkeeper, and winning a gold medal.

He was the secretary of Upton Park F.C., a London-based amateur football team. The team were invited to participate in the 1900 Summer Olympics by the Amateur Status Committee of the Football Association. Upton Park won the tournament with a 4–0 victory over the French representative USFSA.

References

External links

1873 births
1955 deaths
Footballers from Camberwell
English footballers
Association football goalkeepers
Olympic gold medallists for Great Britain
Olympic footballers of Great Britain
Footballers at the 1900 Summer Olympics
Upton Park F.C. players
Olympic medalists in football
Medalists at the 1900 Summer Olympics